Henri Pellizza (21 March 1920 — 20 October 2001) was a French badminton and tennis player.

Pellizza, younger brother of tennis player Pierre Pellizza, came from the city of Pau. His tennis achievements include three third round appearance at the French Championships. He won the 1942 and 1943 mixed doubles titles at the Tournoi de France (the war time Roland Garros). As a badminton player he claimed 18 national titles across singles and doubles. He represented France in the Thomas Cup badminton competition.

References

External links
 

1920 births
2001 deaths
French male tennis players
French male badminton players
Sportspeople from Pau, Pyrénées-Atlantiques